Doris Dörrie (born 26 May 1955) is a German film director, producer and author.

Biography
Born in Hanover, Dörrie completed her secondary education there in 1973. The same year, she began a two-year attendance in film studies in the drama department of the University of the Pacific in Stockton, California. She then studied at the New School of Social Research in New York. She worked odd jobs in cafés and as a film presenter in New York's Goethe-Institut.

In 1975, back in Germany, Dörrie began to study at the University of Television and Film Munich. She wrote film reviews for the Süddeutsche Zeitung, where she was also assistant editor. Subsequently, Dörrie worked as a volunteer for various television stations, and filmed short documentaries. She has published several novels, short story collections and children's books, and also staged and directed a number of operas.

Dörrie is a member of the PEN Centre Germany and the German Film Academy. She was a member of the jury for the 2019 Prize of the National Gallery. Since 2019, she has been a member of the Academy of Motion Picture Arts and Sciences.

Awards
1999 Bavarian Film Awards, Best Screenplay
1999 German Film Award in Gold for Am I Beautiful?
2012 Bavarian Film Award, Best Director

Filmography
1983: Straight Through the Heart (Mitten ins Herz)
1985:  (Im Innern des Wals)
1985: Men... (Männer...)
1986:  (Paradies)
1988: Me and Him (Ich und Er), starring Griffin Dunne, Ellen Greene, Kelly Bishop, Carey Lowell
1989:  (Geld)
1992:  (Happy Birthday, Türke!), starring 
1994:  (Keiner liebt mich)
1998:  – Augenblick (TV documentary series episode)
1998: Am I Beautiful? (Bin ich schön?), starring Franka Potente, Senta Berger, Heike Makatsch, Iris Berben
2000: Enlightenment Guaranteed (Erleuchtung garantiert)
2002: Naked (Nackt)
2005:  (Der Fischer und seine Frau)
2007: , a documentary about Zen chef Edward Espe Brown
2008: Cherry Blossoms (Kirschblüten – Hanami)
2010: The Hairdresser (Die Friseuse)
2012:  (Glück)
2014:  (Alles inklusive)
2016: Greetings from Fukushima
2019:

Fiction
Liebe Schmerz und das ganze verdammte Zeug: Vier Geschichten (1987); Eng. tr. Love, Pain and the Whole Damn Thing: Four Stories (1989)
"Was wollen Sie von Mir?" und 15 andere Geschichten (1989); Eng. tr. What Do You Want From Me? (1993)
Der Mann meiner Träume (1991)
Für immer und ewig: eine Art Reigen (1991)
Bin ich schön? Erzählungen (1994)

References

Citations

Bibliography
Breitenstein, Andreas. "Alptraum vom Traummann: Doris Dörries Erzählung Der Mann meiner Träume." Neue Zürcher Zeitung (22 July 1991).
Elss, Karin. "Doris Dörrie als Erzählerin." Saarbrücker Zeitung (24 August 1989).
Görtz, Franz Josef. "Beiläufige Tragödien: Geschichten von der Filmemacherin Doris Dörrie." Frankfurter Allgemeine Zeitung (14 March 1989).
Joglekar, Yogini. "Ethnic Noir in Post-Wall Germany: Happy Birthday, Türke! (Dörrie 1991)." Clues: A Journal of Detection 24.2 (Winter 2006): 17–29.
Jurczyk, Günther. "Brav Geschmollt: Doris Dörrie erzählt." Stuttgarter Zeitung (11 October 1989).
Phillips, Klaus. "A Conversation with Doris Dörrie." In: Straight Through the Heart: Doris Dörrie, German Filmmaker and Author, ed. Franz Birgel, Klaus Phillips and Christian-Albrecht Gollub. Lanham: Scarecrow Press, 2004. pp. 1–16.
Steuhl, Wolfgang. "Antonia und der Dreckspatz: Wenn ein Mannequin den Mann ihrer Träume findet." Frankfurter Allgemeine Zeitung (13 April 1991).
Utz, Richard. "Reflecting Love at Quite Its Natural Size: Doris Dörrie as a Writer." In: Straight Through the Heart: Doris Dörrie, German Filmmaker and Author, ed. Franz Birgel, Klaus Phillips and Christian-Albrecht Gollub. Lanham: Scarecrow Press, 2004. pp. 177–87.

External links

 
 Literature on Doris Dörrie

German women film directors
1955 births
Living people
Film people from Hanover
University of the Pacific (United States) alumni
University of Television and Film Munich alumni
Members of the Academy of Arts, Berlin